Longuet-Higgins, a double-barrelled name, may refer to:
H. Christopher Longuet-Higgins (1923-2004), theoretical chemist and a cognitive scientist, elder brother to Michael
Michael S. Longuet-Higgins (1925-2016), mathematician and oceanographer, younger brother to Christopher

See also
Longuet
Higgins (surname)

Compound surnames
English-language surnames